The 1991 Spanish motorcycle Grand Prix was the fourth round of the 1991 Grand Prix motorcycle racing season. It took place on the weekend of 10–12 May 1991 at the Jerez circuit.

500 cc race report
Wayne Rainey’s 3rd pole in 4 races; takes turn 1 from Mick Doohan, John Kocinski, Eddie Lawson and Kevin Schwantz.

Rainey and Doohan get a little gap to Kocinski, then it's a large gap to 4th. Doohan starts to open a gap from Rainey, who starts to get pressure from his teammate Kocinski.

Kocinski passes Rainey without much finesse. Doohan wins with a large gap and Kocinski’s 2nd place takes 2 points from Rainey’s standing, so he's now 4 points behind Doohan.

Rainey says that his tire blistered and had to nurse it on the right-handers. Schwantz' Suzuki holed a piston while he was battling for 4th place.

500 cc classification

250 cc classification

125 cc classification

Sidecar classification

References

Spanish motorcycle Grand Prix
Spanish
Motorcycle